Liutgarde of Saxony (932 – 18 November 953), a member of the Ottonian dynasty, was Duchess of Lorraine from 947 until her death by her marriage with Duke Conrad the Red. She and Conrad became progenitors of the Salian dynasty.

Life
Liutgarde was the only daughter of King Otto I of Germany from his first marriage with Edith of England, half-sister of King Æthelstan. To build closer ties to the Salian dynasty, King Otto in 947 married her off to Conrad the Red, whom he had installed as Duke of Lorraine three years before. The marriage was not particularly happy. Around 950 Liutgarde gave birth to a son, Otto of Worms. Her husband accompanied the king on his Italian campaign in 951;  however, he fell out with Otto over the agreements made with King Berengar II.

Liutgarde died at Mainz in 953, where Conrad the Red had joined the rebellion of her elder brother Duke Liudolf of Swabia and Archbishop Frederick. She was buried in St. Alban's Abbey, Mainz Next year, Duke Conrad finally submitted himself to the authority of King Otto and remained a loyal supporter; he died at the 955 Battle of Lechfeld. Liutgarde's brother Liudolf died two years later, while on campaign in Italy.
 
Upon the death of Emperor Otto in 973, the Empire passed through his second wife Adelaide of Italy to their son Otto II. In turn, Liudolf's son Otto I was vested with the Duchy of Swabia, while Liutgarde's son Otto of Worms succeeded as Duke of Carinthia in 978. Upon the death of Emperor Otto III in 1002, Otto of Worms also appeared as a candidate in the royal election but renounced in favour of the Ottonian duke Henry IV of Bavaria, a grandson of Emperor Otto I's brother Duke Henry I. After Henry's death, Liutgarde's great-grandson Conrad II was elected King of the Romans, the first of the Salian dynasty.

Ancestry

References

Sources

 

Ottonian dynasty
Salian dynasty
932 births
953 deaths
German people of Danish descent
German princesses
10th-century German women
10th-century Saxon people
Daughters of emperors

bg:Лиутгарда